The Aéro-Club de France issued Aviators Certificates from 1909. These were internationally recognised under the Fédération Aéronautique Internationale.

List
Legend

See also
 Early Birds of Aviation
Lists for other years
 1909
 1911
 1912
 1913
 1914

References

Bibliography
 
 
 
 
 
 
 

Aviation pioneers
Lists of aviators
1910 in aviation
Aviat
Aéro-Club de France